Calvin Ramsey (July 13, 1937 – March 25, 2019) was an American professional basketball player and broadcaster. A standout college player for NYU, he played 13 NBA games over two seasons. After his playing career ended, he began a 28-year affiliation with the New York Knicks as a broadcaster and a community representative.

Biography

Early life and Career
Ramsey was born in Selma, Alabama on July 13, 1937 but spent most of his life in New York City. In his youth, he played in the Rucker Park League, winning the MVP and was known for his wars with Connie Hawkins. After graduating from High School of Commerce, he joined the NYU Violets as a forward in 1956. At NYU, he played with future hall of famer Thomas “Satch” Sanders. Over three years, he averaged 20.2 points per game and 17.5 rebounds. in his senior year, 1958, Ramsey was named as an All-American. When he died, he still held the school record for rebounds in a game, with 34 against Boston College. As of 2018, he was 11th on NYU's all-time scoring list.

After graduating from NYU with a degree in business, Ramsey entered the 1959 NBA draft where the St. Louis Hawks selected him with the 13th overall pick. At a height of 6’4”, Ramsey was short to play the forward position, but was not a strong enough ball handler to play guard. This limited his career. He played 11 games in his rookie season with the Hawks (he also played for the New York Knicks). Next he played in two games in the 1960–61 season with the Syracuse Nationals. He played semi-pro basketball for one season before injuries forced him to retire.

After his playing days ended, Ramsey charged that a quota system in basketball limited the number of black players in the league at that time. Fellow broadcaster Marv Albert agreed, saying “If you didn’t start as a black player, you wouldn’t be with the team.” Out of basketball, Ramsey became a teacher for several years.

Broadcaster and coach
In 1972, he joined the Knicks broadcasting team, a position he held until 1982. He called the Knicks win over the Los Angeles Lakers in the 1973 NBA Finals and, over his tenure, worked with Dick Stockton for one season, and Marv Albert, who joined the television crew in 1979. In 1982, the Knicks retired Ramsey from the broadcast booth and replaced him with former NBA player Butch Beard.

After leaving the Knicks, he joined the coaching staff of NYU in 1983, which restored its basketball program after a 12-year hiatus. His former teammate at NYU, Mike Muzio, was appointed as the head coach. He continued in that role for the remainder of his life.

Later life
In 1991, the Knicks hired him as a community ambassador where he worked with schools and youth programs. He also attended Knicks games until his health began to fail in 2018.

On March 25, 2019, Ramsey died from cardiac arrest at a rehabilitation facility. Ramsey had suffered from diabetes for a number of years.

Ramsey was inducted into the NYU Athletics Hall of Fame in 1978 and the New York City Basketball Hall of Fame in 1994.

See also
List of NCAA Division I men's basketball players with 30 or more rebounds in a game

References

External links
Cal Ramsey career stats

1937 births
2019 deaths
American men's basketball players
Basketball coaches from Alabama
Basketball players from Alabama
Journalists from Alabama
New York Knicks announcers
New York Knicks players
NYU Violets men's basketball coaches
NYU Violets men's basketball players
Small forwards
Sportspeople from Selma, Alabama
St. Louis Hawks draft picks
St. Louis Hawks players
Syracuse Nationals players